Nürnberg-Reichelsdorf station is a railway station in Nuremberg, Bavaria, Germany. The station is on the Nuremberg–Roth line of Deutsche Bahn. It is served by Nuremberg S-Bahn line S2.

History
The station first opened on 1 April 1849. It was rebuilt in 2001 to serve the Nuremberg S-Bahn.

References

Reichelsdorf
Reichelsdorf
Railway stations in Germany opened in 1849